There are many hill stations in Pakistan, where there is snow in the winter. In the summer, the temperatures are much cooler than the hot areas of Punjab and Sindh. People from all over the country flock to these hill stations to enjoy the snow in winters, and to enjoy the cool summers away from the hot plains. The following is a list of hill stations:

List

See also
 Tourism in Pakistan
 Geography of Pakistan

References

External links
 Hill station in Pakistan at 

Hill Stations

Hill stations